The voiceless or more precisely tenuis retroflex click is a rare click consonant. There is no symbol for it in the International Phonetic Alphabet.

Features
Features of the tenuis retroflex click:

Occurrence
The tenuis retroflex click is only confirmed from a single language, Central !Kung.

References

Click consonants
Retroflex consonants
Oral consonants
Central consonants
Tenuis consonants